Gabriele Tredozi (born September 9, 1957, in Brisighella, Italy) is a former engineer with the Minardi and Scuderia Toro Rosso Formula One teams.

While studying mechanical engineering at Bologna University, Tredozi began working for Minardi as an assistant race engineer. Between 1988 and 1996, he race engineered for Pierluigi Martini, Adrián Campos, Christian Fittipaldi, Fabrizio Barbazza and Pedro Lamy. In 1997, following the departure of Aldo Costa to Ferrari, he was appointed as the team's technical coordinator. Responsible for both the design and production areas as well as for on-track technical management, he stayed in that role under technical director Gustav Brunner. When Brunner moved to Toyota in 2001, Tredozi became technical director, where he controlled the day-to-day operation of the drawing office as well as the technical staff. When Minardi was bought and turned into Scuderia Toro Rosso, he stayed on until he was replaced by Alex Hitzinger in mid-2006.

Married to Claudia, he has one son, Tommaso.  His main hobby is cycling.

References
Profile at grandprix.com

1957 births
Living people
Formula One designers
Italian motorsport people